Vizz Africa was an MVNO using Vodafone UK. The service was focused on African communities in the United Kingdom. Vizz Africa was one of the Vizz Mobile ethnic niche brands operated by QiComm Limited. The service was launched in October 2011 at Black History Live, an event at the beginning of Black History Month.

References

External links
Official website
About Vizz Africa

Mobile virtual network operators
Vodafone